Daikakuji Seamount is a seamount (underwater volcano) and the southwesternmost volcanic feature in the Hawaiian Emperor chain bend area.

Geology
The seamount is very close to the "V"-shaped bend in the Hawaiian-Emperor seamount chain, and thus would be useful in understanding the exact age of the bend. Although few dredge samples are available, they have all been reliably dated at 47 million years (Sharp and Clague, Science, 313, 1281–84, 2006), during the Eocene epoch of the Paleogene period.

Because of its flat capped top, Daikakuji is considered a guyot. A smaller, younger, secondary guyot just east of the main mass overlaps its slope. The western site suffered a large collapse sometime in its history, evident by a large slump, that likely carried away a significant part of the volcano's caldera.

Daikakuji Seamount has some well developed rift zones oriented towards the Emperor portion of the chain, whereas the younger, secondary cone has rift flanks in the direction of the Hawaiian ridge.

See also
List of volcanoes in the Hawaiian – Emperor seamount chain

References

Hawaiian–Emperor seamount chain
Seamounts of the Pacific Ocean
Guyots
Hotspot volcanoes
Eocene volcanoes
Paleogene Oceania